Vichu Vishwanath is an Indian actor who has appeared in Tamil language films and serials. He has worked in comedy and supporting roles, often associating with director Sundar C.

Career 
Vichu Vishwanath was born in Coimbatore, India and attended RK Sreerangammal Kalvi Nilayam Higher Secondary School in the city. Vichu is married to Hemalatha, and has a daughter, Kokila. He made his acting debut in the film, Sandhana Kaatru (1990) and portrayed a villainous character alongside Sarathkumar and Vijay Krishnaraj. During the making of the film, he became acquainted with Sundar C, who was an assistant director in the film. He then made his first collaboration with director Sundar C in Murai Maman (1996), while also beginning an association with actress Raadhika and her production studio.

In 2017, he moved on to work on Sundar C's television studio, Nandini.

Notable filmography 
Films

 Sandhana Kaatru (1990)
 Thai Maaman (1994)
 Mettupatti Mirasu (1994)
 Murai Mappillai (1995)
 Ullathai Allitha (1996)
 Mettukudi (1996)
 Nesam (1997)
 Thedinen Vanthathu (1997)
 Arunachalam (1997)
 Sishya (1997)
 Ganga Gowri (1997)
 Moovendhar (1998)
 Suyamvaram (1999)
 Unakkaga Ellam Unakkaga (1999)
 Game (2002)
 Anbe Sivam (2003)
 Winner (2003)
 London (2005)
 Thalainagaram (2006)
 Veerappu (2007)
 Sandai (2008)
 Aayudham Seivom (2008)
 Guru Sishyan (2010)
 Nagaram Marupakkam (2010)
 Mappillai (2011)
 Kalakalappu (2012)
 Murattu Kaalai (2012)
 Madha Gaja Raja (2012)
 Theeya Velai Seiyyanum Kumaru (2013)
 Alex Pandian (2013)
 Kaadu (2014)
 Aranmanai (2014)
 Aadama Jaichomada (2014)
 Aambala (2015)
 Thiruttu VCD (2015)
 Aranmanai 2 (2016)
 Hello Naan Pei Pesuren (2016)
 Muthina Kathirika (2016)
 Kannula Kaasa Kattappa (2016)
 Kalakalappu 2 (2018)
 Mannar Vagaiyara (2018)
 Vantha Rajavathaan Varuven (2019)
 Naan Sirithal (2020)
 Naanga Romba Busy (2020)
Aranmanai 3 (2021)
Coffee with Kadhal (2022)

Television

References

External links 

Indian male film actors
Male actors in Tamil cinema
Living people
21st-century Indian male actors
Indian male comedians
Tamil comedians
1960 births